My Blue World is the fourth studio album by German band Bad Boys Blue. It was released on 10 October 1988 by Coconut Records. The record includes three singles: "A World Without You (Michelle)", "Don't Walk Away, Susanne", and "Lovers in the Sand".

Background
All the songs were performed by Trevor Taylor and John McInerney. Starting from this album, John McInerney has secured himself a position as the band's new leader and vocalist. My Blue World album was the last one with Taylor. Track "Till the End of Time" was at the beginning designed to be a title song for this album, but producers changed their mind, and the record was released under the name My Blue World.

Track listing
"A World Without You (Michelle) (Radio Edit)" – 3:32
"Don't Leave Me Now" – 6:10
"Bad Reputation" – 3:36
"Don't Walk Away Suzanne" – 3:50
"Love Don't Come Easy" – 3:42
"Lovers in the Sand" – 3:46
"Till the End of Time" – 4:22
"Lonely Weekend" – 3:38
"Rain in My Heart" – 4:12
"A World Without You (Michelle) (Classical Mix)" – 3:30

Personnel
Bad Boys Blue
John McInerney – lead vocal (1, 2, 4, 6, 7, 8, 9, 10) 
Trevor Taylor – lead vocal (3, 5)
Andrew Thomas

Additional personnel
All tracks written by T. Hendrik/K.van Haaren except 5 written by T. Taylor, Hans Steingen/T. Taylor
Produced by Tony Hendrik and Karin Hartmann; 1 and 10 produced by Tony Hendrik
Arranged by Tony Hendrik, Klaus-D. Gebauer, Claus-Robert Kruse, Hans-Jürgen Fritz, Günther Lammers
Recorded and mixed by Gary Jones, Klaus-D. Gebauer, Claus-Robert Kruse, Günther Kasper, Helmuth Rüssmann and Andreas Martin at Coconut Studio, Hennef; Sound Studio "N", Köln; Cool Cat Studio, Hamburg; Tonstudio Rüssmann, Hennef.

Chart performance
In 1988, My Blue World reached #48 in German music charts.

References

External links
ALBUM – My Blue World

1988 albums
Bad Boys Blue albums